Jon E. Litscher (born October 22, 1944) was the Wisconsin Secretary of Corrections, serving from March 2016 until May 2018 and from 1999 to 2003. Litscher has served as a cabinet secretary in various roles in the administrations of Tommy Thompson, Scott McCallum, and Scott Walker.

Biography

Career
Litscher received a bachelor's degree in elementary education from the University of Wisconsin–Whitewater in 1966, a master's degree in educational administration from the University of Wisconsin–Milwaukee in 1970, and a specialist certificate in educational administration from the University of Wisconsin–Milwaukee in 1976.

Litscher worked as an elementary school teacher, elementary school principal, and school district superintendent. Litscher's first political appointment was to serve as Executive Secretary of the Higher Educational Aids Board from 1987 to 1990. From 1991-1999, Litscher served as the Wisconsin Secretary of the Department of Employment Relations, and from 1999 until his first retirement in 2003, Litscher served his first term as the Secretary of the Department of Corrections. Litscher served in local government as the City Council President in Beaver Dam, Wisconsin. As City Council President, Litscher helped the Beaver Dam Senior Center earn national accreditation.

Litscher was reappointed to serve as Secretary of the Wisconsin Department of Corrections in February 2016, succeeding Ed Wall. His confirmation hearing before the Senate Judiciary Committee was held on March 2. Upon his reappointment and amid widespread allegations of abuse at the Lincoln Hills juvenile corrections facility, Litscher pledged to restore trust between the agency and the public. Litscher has been an outspoken advocate for restorative practices and prevention programs, endorsing the annual More Kids Drug Free campaign.

In his cabinet role, Litscher oversees more than 10,000 employees throughout the state of Wisconsin. Under Litscher, the Department of Corrections has put a large focus on reforming youth correctional facilities. Reforms have included increasing physical and mental health staffing, improving training and compensation for youth counselors, requiring the use of body cameras to document youth counselor interactions, and revising accountability procedures.

References

1944 births
Living people
People from Beaver Dam, Wisconsin
University of Wisconsin–Milwaukee alumni
University of Wisconsin–Whitewater alumni
Educators from Wisconsin
State cabinet secretaries of Wisconsin
Wisconsin Republicans